MDCC may refer to:
 Mississippi Delta Community College
 Muscular Dystrophy Coordinating Committee: see Muscular Dystrophy Community Assistance Research and Education Amendments of 2001#MDCC
 MDCC, Roman numerals for the year 1700